Year 1421 (MCDXXI) was a common year starting on Wednesday (link will display the full calendar) of the Julian calendar.

Events 
 January–December 
 February 2 – Yongle Emperor, third emperor of the Ming Dynasty, shifts the Ming capital from Nanjing to Beijing.
March 3 – Zheng He receives imperial order from Yongle Emperor to bring imperial letters, silk products, and other gifts to various rulers of countries around the Indian Ocean. 
 March 21 – Battle of Baugé: A small French force surprises and defeats a smaller English force under Thomas, Duke of Clarence, a brother of Henry V of England, in Normandy.
 May 26 – Mehmed I, Sultan of the Ottoman Empire, dies and is succeeded by his son, Murad II.
 November 17–19 – St. Elizabeth's flood: The coastal area near Dordrecht in the Netherlands is flooded, due to the extremely high tide of the North Sea; 72 villages are drowned, killing about 10,000 people, and the course of the Meuse is changed.

 Date unknown 
 John III of Dampierre, Marquis of Namur, sells his estates to Philip the Good, Duke of Burgundy.
 The first patent is issued by the Republic of Florence.
 Portuguese sailors sent by Henry the Navigator cross Cape Non, going as far as Cape Bojador.
 Traditional date – Larabanga Mosque is founded, in modern-day northern Ghana.

Births 
 March 9 – Francesco Sassetti, Italian banker (d. 1490)
 May 29 – Charles, Prince of Viana (d. 1461)
 June 3 – Giovanni di Cosimo de' Medici, Italian noble (d. 1463)
 July 25 – Henry Percy, 3rd Earl of Northumberland, English politician (d. 1461)
 August 1 – Thomas Dutton, English knight (d. 1459)
 October 10 – John Paston, English politician (d. 1466)
 December 6 – King Henry VI of England (d. 1471)
 date unknown – Sōgi, Japanese poet and Buddhist priest (d. 1502)

Deaths 
 January 10 – Niccolò I Trinci, lord of Foligno (assassinated)
 January 15 – Helvis of Brunswick-Grubenhagen, queen consort of Armenia and Cyprus (born 1353)
 March 22 – Thomas of Lancaster, 1st Duke of Clarence, second son of Henry IV of England (killed in battle) (born 1388)
 April 21 – John FitzAlan, 13th Earl of Arundel (born 1385)
 May – Balša III, ruler of Zeta
 May 26 – Mehmed I, Ottoman Sultan (b. 1389)
 June 21 – Jean Le Maingre, marshal of France (b. 1366)

References